The Vicini family is the wealthiest family in the Dominican Republic and is best known for their vast holdings in the sugar industry. The family business was started by Juan Bautista Vicini Canepa, who migrated to the Dominican Republic from Italy in 1860.

Juan Bautista Vicini 
Juan Bautista Vicini Canepa, was born on February 25, 1847, in Zoagli, a coastal village near Genoa to Angelo Vicini and Anna Canepa. Vicini left Italy and went to the Dominican Republic in 1860 at the age of 21
.  He was invited to travel to the Dominican Republic as an apprentice to join his countryman Nicole Genevaro who was an exporter of coffee and sugar. After a few years, he purchased the operations belonging to Mr. Genevaro.

Juan Bautista, better known as "Baciccia", was very successful in business. Thanks in part to his hard work and his savings, he managed to acquire land for the cultivation of sugar cane.

His family residence is located on the Avenida Isabel la Católica No. 158, in the city of Santo Domingo, marked with a placard reading J.B. Vicini. This designation is still preserved on the facades of the building belonging to the family. This residence was his place of work. Locals gave it the name Casa Vicini.

Eleven children were born of his marriage to Mercedes Laura Perdomo Santamaría. Seven of them went to live with her to Genoa, Italy. While being married, he had an affair with María Burgos Brito and begat 3 children, among them, President Juan Bautista Vicini Burgos.

Vicini Canepa, patriarch of the Vicini family, returned only once to Italy and died in 1900 at the age of 53.

Felipe and Juan  Vicini Perdomo 

Upon his death, Juan and Felipe Vicini Perdomo, suspended their professional studies in Italy to take over the family business in the Dominican Republic.

Felipe and Juan Vicini Perdomo increased investment to modernize the factory and field work in the sugar, in real estate both in urban and rural areas of the country.

The political and economic pressure of the Dominican dictator Rafael Leonidas Trujillo by appropriating all the national wealth, forced the family Vicini Cabral to transfer their residence abroad.

Third generation 

The third generation of the Vicinis was constituted by José María Vicini Cabral, Jose Benedicto Vicini Vargas , Jose Leopoldo Vicini Perez, Marco Antonio Vicini Perez , Jose Alejandro Vicini Rocher, Juan Bautista (Gianni), Felipe and Laura Vicini Cabral, under the leadership of Gianni; this generation participated actively in the process of overthrowing the dictatorship, the country's economic consolidation and democratic process of the nation.

The beginning of democracy with the death of Dominican dictator Trujillo in 1961, he found a country where almost all economic areas had been dominated by the dictator and his closest relatives and collaborators.

The active participation as well as the capital of the Vicini family was instrumental in creating private banks, universities, associations, businesses and nonprofit foundations, all promoters of the country's development and new business that channeled the nation towards development. The family Vicini Cabral participated in those efforts, both as advocates, with financial resources and with the participation and personal presence.

Laura and Felipe Vicini Cabral died childless.

Fourth generation
The 4th generation of the Vicini entrepreneurial dynasty is comprised by the siblings Amelia Stella, Felipe, and Juan Bautista Vicini Lluberes and their first cousins José Leopoldo and Marco Vicini Pérez.

Family tree

The Price of Sugar 

The Vicini Family was depicted in The Price of Sugar, a 2007 documentary by Bill Haney about exploitation of Haitian immigrants in the Dominican Republic involved with production of sugar. The documentary shows the poor working conditions in the sugar cane plantations, and describes the actions taken by the Vicini family to stifle efforts to change the situation.

Subjects of the film, Felipe and Juan Bautista Vicini Lluberes, filed a defamation suit on August 31, 2007, against Uncommon Productions and producer Bill Haney, alleging 53 factual inaccuracies.  According to Read McCaffrey, a partner in the law firm Patton Boggs representing the Vicinis, 'The misrepresentation are very egregious and as deceptive as I have seen in a very long time.'" However, according to the First Circuit Court of Appeals, the Vicini family "later winnowed the number of allegedly defamatory statements down to seven". The Appeals Court upheld a judgment from a lower court that the Vicini brothers were "public figures under the circumstances". The brothers thus must prove that the filmmakers made false depictions and knew about it. If they had been private figures, as the plaintiffs had unsuccessfully tried to prove, the filmmakers could have been liable for publishing information without verifying its truth. The appeals court sent the case back to the lower court to decide if the filmmakers have to hand over a report that they prepared to obtain insurance coverage for the film. After that, the lower court can determine whether information shown in the film was false and, if it was the case, if the filmmakers knew about it.

References

Ferran, Fernando. The legacy of Jose Maria Vicini Cabral, Santo Domingo, Dominican Republic, 2007.

See also
 Juan Bautista Vicini Burgos

Italian families
Dominican Republic families
Dominican Republic people of Italian descent
People of Ligurian descent
White Dominicans